Time in Tunisia is given by a single time zone, officially denoted as Central European Time (CET; UTC+01:00). Tunisia adopted WAT on 12 April 1911, and does not observe daylight saving time, though previously it has.

Daylight saving time 
Tunisia previously observed daylight saving time – advancing the clock forward one hour – between 1939 and 1945, 1977 and 1978, 1988 and 1990, and finally between 2006 and 2008.

IANA time zone database 
In the IANA time zone database, Tunisia is given one zone in the file zone.tab – Africa/Tunis. "TN" refers to the country's ISO 3166-1 alpha-2 country code. Data for Tunisia directly from zone.tab of the IANA time zone database; columns marked with * are the columns from zone.tab itself:

See also 
List of time zones by country
List of UTC time offsets

References

External links 
Current time in Tunisia at Time.is
Time in Tunisia at TimeAndDate.com

Time in Tunisia